Heinrich Reitz was a German rugby union player who competed in the 1900 Summer Olympics.

He was a member of the German rugby union team, which won the silver medal. Germany was represented at the tournament by the FC 1880 Frankfurt rather than an official national team.

References

External links

 

Year of birth missing
Year of death missing
German rugby union players
Rugby union players at the 1900 Summer Olympics
Olympic rugby union players of Germany
Olympic silver medalists for Germany
SC 1880 Frankfurt players
Rugby union centres
Place of birth missing